Long Gone may refer to:

 Luke "Long Gone" Miles (born 1925), an American blues singer
 "Long Gone (instrumental)", a 1948 instrumental song by Sonny Thompson
 "Long Gone", a song by Syd Barrett from the 1970 album The Madcap Laughs
 "Long Gone", a song by George Thorogood and the Destroyers from the 1985 album Maverick
 Long Gone (film), a 1987 baseball film
 "Long Gone", a song by Guy from the 1990 album The Future
 Long Gone (album), a 1997 album by Jimmy D. Lane
 "Long Gone" (Six60 song)
 "Long Gone", a song by Chris Cornell from the 2009 album Scream
 "Long Gone", a song by Juice Wrld from the 2018 album Goodbye & Good Riddance
 "Long Gone", a song by Nelly from the 2010 album 5.0